Pangkal Pinang is the capital and largest city of the Bangka Belitung Islands Province in Indonesia. It is located on Bangka Island's east coast, the city is divided into seven districts (kecamatan) and has 42 wards (kelurahan).

The city's population density is about 2,426 per square kilometre in 2020. Muhammad Irwansyah is the mayor; he was preceded by Zulkarnain Karim, who served for two terms (2003–2013). The Rangkui River divides the city into two parts, and Jalan Merdeka is its geographic center.

Pangkal Pinang's population consists largely of ethnic Malays and Chinese Hakka who came from Guangzhou. There are also smaller immigrant communities of other ethnic groups, such as Batak and Minangkabau. Landmarks in the city include the Timah Museum, a Chinese temple, the Cathedral of St. Joseph, the Bangka Botanical Garden, and the Pasir Padi beach.

Etymology
Pangkalpinang is derived from the local words pengkal ("base") and pinang (Areca catechu, a species of palm tree widely grown on the island of Bangka).

History

Pre-colonial rule
As part of Srivijaya, Pangkalpinang was inhabited by Hindus. In addition to being a territory of Sriwijaya, it was also a territory of Majapahit and the Mataram Kingdom. In all three kingdoms, Pangkalpinang received little attention despite its proximity to international shipping routes and became a hideout for pirates preying on ships in the South China Sea

To secure the shipping routes around the Strait of Malacca, the Johor Sultanate sent troops to Pangkalpinang and began spreading Islam in the region. However, the pirates soon returned.

Years later, in another attempt to rid the area of piracy, the Sultan of Banten sent a regent of the Indonesian archipelago to eradicate the pirates. The regent established control and ruled Bangka until his death, when his authority passed to his only daughter.

Colonial rule

Around 1709, tin was found on the banks of the Olin River in Toboali District. With the discovery of tin, merchants from China and elsewhere flocked to the region; the Sultan of Palembang sent representatives to China in search of tin experts. In 1717, the Palembang Sultanate began developing trade relationships with the Dutch East India Company (VOC). With the company's help, the sultan attempted to eradicate piracy and tin smuggling.

The Netherlands was occupied by France at the height of the Napoleonic Wars, and the British seized all areas in Nusantara under Dutch governance. In accordance with the Tuntang Agreement, on 18 September 1811 the Dutch handed over the island of Java, Timor, Makassar, and Palembang to the British; Pangkal Pinang become a British colony. Stamford Raffles sent emissaries to Palembang to take over the Dutch fort in Sungai Aur, but they were rejected by Sultan Mahmud Badaruddin II. Raffles also demanded the tin mines in Pangkal Pinang from Badaruddin.

Raffles sent an expedition to Palembang, led by Rollo Gillespie, on 20 March 1812. Gillespie replaced Mahmud Badaruddin II with Prince Adipati, giving him the title of Sultan Ahmad Najamuddin II, and the new sultan handed over the islands of Belitung and Bangka Islands to the British.

In accordance with the Anglo-Dutch Treaty of 1824, the Netherlands regained areas occupied in 1803 by the British (including Pangkal Pinang). The native people were subjected to fraud, extortion, and forced labor by the Dutch and the British. The Dutch exploited the tin reserves; guerrilla warfare was fought in Musi Rawas, and Pangkal Pinang fought to expel the Dutch.

During World War II, Bangka Island was occupied by Japanese troops. Although the occupation of Pangkal Pinang was brief, shortages of food and clothing were severe.

Independent Indonesia
After Japan surrendered to the Allies and the Indonesia proclaimed its independence, Pangkalpinang became part of Indonesia. (initially as part of the province of South Sumatra). After the country's political landscape changed, Bangka Belitung Islands were separated from South Sumatra and combined as a province with Pangkalpinang its capital.

Demographics

Pangkalpinang's population was 108,411 in 1990, and 174,838 in the 2010 census, rising to 216,893 at the 2020 Census. Half are Malay, and primarily speak Bangka Malay. The remainder are Chinese, descendants of 18th-century emigrants from Guangdong province. Locally known as Peranakan (Children of the Indies), they primarily speak Hakka; a small community speaks Cantonese. Their endonym is Thong Ngin, and other Malays are known as Fan Ngin.

Islam is the largest religion. The Chinese primarily adhere to Buddhism and Christianity, with a minority embracing Taoism and Confucianism.

Geography

Topography
Hilly areas are primarily in the west and south, including Mount Girimaya (50 metres above sea level) and Tower Hill. A  urban forest is in the Old Village area. The remaining  are swamps and forest.

Geology
The city's soil has an average pH below 5, with red-yellow podzolic soil and regosol. A small area is bog soil and light-gray regosol derived from the deposition of sand and clay. Although such soil is less suitable for rice, other crops may be grown. The oldest formations are Permo-Carboniferous limestone, Late Triassic slate and Triassic-Jurassic granite. Composition of the granitic rocks includes dark-colored (occasionally green) biotite and amphibole.

Hydrology
The Rangkui River flows through the city, and the Pedindang River is in the south. They drain into the Baturusa River, which flows to the South China Sea. The rivers provided transport to markets, and make Pangkal Pinang prone to flooding (especially during the rainy season or at times of high tide).

Climate
Pangkal Pinang has a tropical rainforest climate (Af) with heavy rainfall year-round. Rain gets noticeably heavier from November to April.

Administrative Districts
At the time of the 2010 Census, the city was divided into five districts (kecamatan), but two additional districts were created subsequently. These are all tabulated below with their areas and their populations at the 2010 Census and 2020 Census. The table also includes the numbers of administrative villages (rural desa and urban kelurahan) in each district, and its postal code.

Notes: (a) the 2010 population of the areas which later became Girimaya and Gabek districts is included in the figures for the districts from which they were cut out.

Attractions

Nganggung, a food-sharing tradition, is usually performed on religious holidays such as Lebaran and Eid al-Adha. The Qingming Festival (Ceng Beng, in Hakka Chinese) is also celebrated.

The Tin Museum is Asia's only tin museum, and was the site of the 7 May 1949 Roem–Van Roijen Agreement on the future of independent Indonesia. The 1936 Jamik Mosque, in Jalan Masjid Jamik, is one of the largest and oldest mosques in Pangkal Pinang. Kwan Tie Miaw temple, on the Jalan Mayor Muhidin, is one of the oldest temples on the island of Bangka. Formerly known as the Kwan Tie Bio Temple, it is estimated to have been built in 1841 and dedicated to Lord Guan. GPIB Maranatha, originally the Kerkeraad der Protestansche Gemeente to Pangkalpinang, was built in 1927. After independence, the church's name was changed to Western Indonesian Protestant Church (GPIB) Maranatha Pangkalpinang.

Cuisine
Tai Fu Sui, also known as fu sui is a popular drink similar to soy milk.
Pantiaw or kwetiaw is made from sago and rice flour and usually served with fish soup.

Transportation
Angkots are used in and around the city in lieu of public transit.

Air
Depati Amir Airport is the airport serving Bangka Belitung, with daily flights to Jakarta, Palembang, Tanjung Pandan, Surabaya and Batam by Garuda Indonesia, Citilink, Lion Air and Sriwijaya Air.

Sea
Pangkal Balam is the city's main seaport, providing daily export and import, inter-island trade and passenger transport to and from Jakarta and Tanjung Pandan. Smaller seaports, such as Muntok, serves speedboats to and from Palembang.

Economy
The city's economy is based on agricultural products: food crops, livestock, marine and freshwater fishing and small plantations (rubber, pepper and coconut). Pangkal Pinang also has a scenic beach.

Notable residents
 Artika Sari Devi, Puteri Indonesia 2004, Top 15 Miss Universe 2005, actress, model and spokesperson.
 Sandra Dewi, actress and model
 Natasha Mannuela Halim, Miss Indonesia 2016, 2nd Runner-Up Miss World 2016, Beauty with a Purpose winner, actress and model
 Sonia Fergina Citra, Puteri Indonesia 2018, Top 20 Miss Universe 2018 and model

Sister city
Ambon, Indonesia

See also
 Pangkalpinang Airport
 Roman Catholic Diocese of Pangkal-Pinang

References

External links

 Satellite picture by Google Maps
 Some Overview by www.indonesia.travel
 Demographic and Climate by beta.pangkalpinang.go.id

Populated places in the Bangka Belitung Islands
Provincial capitals in Indonesia